Theda M. Daniels-Race is an American engineer and Michael B. Voorhies Distinguished Professor in the Division of Electrical and Computer Engineering at Louisiana State University. Her research is in nanoelectronics, specialising in the growth and characterization of nanomaterials and hybrid electronic devices based on compound semiconductors.

Early life and education 
Daniels-Race became very interested in science at a young age, and after a conversation with her parents before she began kindergarten about how long people spend in school, decided at age five that one day she would pursue a Ph.D. to become a scientist.

Daniels-Race was a recipient of the National Achievement Scholarship and obtained her undergraduate degree in electrical engineering from Rice University in 1983. She completed an MSc in the same discipline from Stanford University in 1985, funded by the Graduate Engineering Minorities Fellowship.

She was one of the ten students selected for the nationally awarded AT&T Cooperative Research Fellowship Program to pursue her doctorate in electrical engineering at Cornell University. Daniels-Race's thesis was titled "A spectrometric study of high-energy electrons using planar-doped barrier (PBD) launchers", and her research focused on developing a series of spectrometers based on PBD launchers to observe quantum mechanical phenomena. In her work, she used molecular beam epitaxy techniques to grow vertical field effect transistor spectrometers and demonstrated the first observation of hot electrons and ballistic transport effects in these systems. She obtained her Ph.D. in 1990, and was the 19th African American woman to earn a PhD in physics, astronomy or a related field in the United States.

Research and career 
Daniels-Race joined the Department of Electrical and Computer Engineering faculty at Duke University in 1989, where she established the university's first molecular beam epitaxy laboratory and founded their experimental research programme into III-IV semiconductor materials, with federal funding from the National Science Foundation. She was a visiting scholar at the Microelectronics Research Center at the University Texas Austin in spring 1995. From 2001 to 2003, she was awarded funding from the US Department of Energy to investigate the effects of variation in molecular beam epitaxy growth of tensile-strained two-dimensional structures. Her work at Duke was also focused on studying quantum mechanical phenomena such as electron-phonon interactions, and developing microelectronic devices based on GaAs, AlGaAs and InAlAs quantum wells.

In 2003, she joined Louisiana State University as an associate professor in electrical and computer engineering, where she is now Michael B. Voorhies Distinguished Professor. At LSU, she began a new line of research studying vacuum deposition growth techniques to develop hybrid electronic materials based on compound semiconductor electronics. Her group was awarded funding from the Board of Regents of LSU via the National Science Foundation Links with Industry, Research Centers, and National Laboratories programme (LINK), to pursue work in microelectronics in collaboration with University of Texas at Austin. Her research also focuses on the material growth and optoelectronic characterisation of other low-dimensional nanostructures such as carbon nanotubes and transition metal dichalcogenides.

During her career, Daniels-Race has worked closely with industry partners such as Union Carbide, Exxon Research and Engineering Company, General Electric, and AT&T Bell Laboratories. She is also a member of the advisory board of the Department of Physics and Engineering at Tulane University, an advocate for women in minorities in STEM, and an active member of several professional societies such as the American Physical Society, Materials Research Society, and the National Society of Black Physicists.

Daniels-Race has published a book chapter on the fabrication and design of low-dimensional devices and their applications for the book Nanolithography: The Art of Fabricating Nanoelectronic and Nanophotonic Devices and Systems.

References 

African-American engineers
American women engineers
20th-century American engineers
21st-century American engineers
Stanford University alumni
Cornell University alumni
20th-century American women scientists
21st-century American women scientists
Rice University alumni
Louisiana State University faculty
American nanotechnologists
Year of birth missing (living people)
Living people
American women academics
20th-century African-American women
20th-century African-American scientists
21st-century African-American women
21st-century African-American scientists